LTT 1445 is a triple M-dwarf system about 22 light-years distant in the constellation Eridanus. The primary LTT 1445 A hosts two exoplanets- one discovered in 2019 that transits the star every 5.36 days, and another found in 2021 that transits the star every 3.12 days, close to a 12:7 resonance. As of August 2019 it is the second closest transiting exoplanet system discovered, with the closest being HD 219134 bc.

Stellar system 
All three stars in the system are M-dwarfs, with masses between 0.16  and 0.26 . LTT 1445 A and LTT 1445 BC are separated by about 34 astronomical units and orbit each other with a period of about 250 years. The BC pair orbit each other about every 36 years in an eccentric orbit (e= ~0.5). The alignment of the three stars and the edge-on orbit of the BC pair suggests co-planarity of the system. The existence of a transiting planet LTT 1445Ab suggests that the entire system is co-planar, with orbits in one plane.

The TESS light curve showed stellar flares and rotational modulation due to starspots, likely on either the B or C component.

Planetary system 
LTT 1445Ab was discovered in June 2019 with data from the Transiting Exoplanet Survey Satellite by astrophysicists of the Harvard Center for Astrophysics. The team obtained follow-up observations, including HARPS radial velocity measurements to constrain the mass of the planet. The planet orbits only one host star in a stable orbit. The planet likely has a rocky composition and because it orbits close to the M-dwarf, it has an equilibrium temperature of  Kelvin (160 °C; 320 °F). In July 2021, the mass of the planet was measured as  Earth masses, confirming an earthlike composition.

A second planet, LTT 1445Ac, was also found on a 3.12 day orbital period, with a mass of  Earth masses. Although it transits the star too, its smaller size made it difficult to detect before the radial velocity measurements, and still makes it difficult to estimate its exact size. The planets orbit near a 12:7 orbital resonance with one another - Ac orbiting 11.988 times for every 7 orbits Ab makes - oscillating one full orbit away from a 'perfect' resonance every 104 years. The planet's existence was confirmed in 2022, along with a 3rd planetary candidate on the 24.3 days orbit.

Also, there is a gap between the orbit of this candidate and neighbouring LTT 1445Ab. If this gap is not empty, a still undiscovered fourth planet in it will be a Venus-twin, probably slightly smaller than Venus.

It is worth noting that LTT 1445Ad receives approx. 76% of Earth's flux and is possibly rocky, spending its full orbit near the middle of the habitable zone. LTT 1445 Ad is the nearest currently known potentially habitable exoplanet orbiting a star with at least 0.2% of solar luminosity and earlier than M5V spectral type (though Luyten b is closer, at 1.2 earth insolations and with a significantly more dense atmosphere, its habitability is much less certain).

See also
 List of star systems within 20–25 light-years
 List of nearest exoplanets
 EZ Aquarii nearby M-dwarf triple
 GJ 1245 nearby M-dwarf triple
 Gliese 667 Cc

References

14101
Triple star systems
M-type main-sequence stars
455
Planetary systems with two confirmed planets
3
Eridanus (constellation)
Durchmusterung objects